The 2020 Minnesota House of Representatives election was held in the U.S. state of Minnesota on November 3, 2020, to elect members to the House of Representatives of the 92nd Minnesota Legislature. A primary election was held in several districts on August 11, 2020. The election coincided with the election of the other house of the Legislature, the Senate, and other elections.

Background
The last election in 2018 resulted in the Minnesota Democratic–Farmer–Labor Party (DFL) winning a majority of 75 seats, ending four years of a Republican majority. As there was no Senate election, this resulted in split control of the Legislature with Republicans holding a majority in the Senate they won in 2016.

Electoral system
The 134 members of the House of Representatives were elected from single-member districts via first-past-the-post voting for two-year terms. Contested nominations of recognized major parties (DFL, Grassroots-Legalize Cannabis, Legal Marijuana Now, and Republican) for each district were determined by an open primary election. Minor party candidates were nominated by petition. Write-in candidates must have filed a request with the secretary of state's office for votes for them to be counted. The filing period was from May 19 to June 2, 2020.

Retiring members

DFL 
 Ben Lien, 4A
 Jack Considine, 19B
 Duane Sauke, 25B
 Lyndon Carlson, 45A
 Laurie Halverson, 51B
 Hunter Cantrell, 56A
 Alice Mann, 56B
 Jean Wagenius, 63B
 Tim Mahoney, 67A

Republican 
 Dan Fabian, 1A
 Sandy Layman, 5B
 Bud Nornes, 8A
 Bob Vogel, 20A
 Bob Gunther, 23A
 Linda Runbeck, 38A

Primary elections results
A primary election was held in 23 districts to nominate Republican and DFL candidates. 11 Republican nominations and 12 DFL nominations were contested. Nine incumbents were opposed for their party's nomination. DFL incumbents Raymond Dehn in District 59B and John Lesch in District 66B were not renominated.

Predictions

Results

Close races
Districts where the margin of victory was under 10%:
District 3
Seat A, 4.92%
District 4
Seat B, 5.51%
District 5
Seat A, 6.91% (gain)
District 6
Seat A, 0.19% 
Seat B, 9.21% 
District 11
Seat A, 2.93%
District 14
Seat A, 8.1%
District 19
Seat A, 0.48% (gain)
District 20
Seat B, 5.09%
District 26
Seat B, 1.26%
District 27
Seat B, 3.18% (gain)
District 33
Seat B, 1.11%
District 34
Seat B, 7.36%
District 36
Seat B, 2.89%
District 37
Seat B, 4.92%
District 38
Seat A, 7.3%
Seat B, 0.36%
District 39
Seat B, 0.85%
District 47
Seat B, 3.21%
District 53
Seat B, 6.26%
District 54
Seat A, 2.96% gain
Seat B, 7.21%
District 55
Seat A, 2.41% gain
District 56
Seat A, 3.33%
Seat B, 4.88%

District results

Seats changing parties

See also
 2020 Minnesota Senate election
 2020 Minnesota elections
 2018 Minnesota gubernatorial election

Notes

References

External links
 Elections & Voting - Minnesota Secretary of State
 
 
  (State affiliate of the U.S. League of Women Voters)
 

Minnesota House of Representatives
Minnesota House
Minnesota House of Representatives elections